The Campaign Against Political Correctness was a lobby group in the United Kingdom created to oppose what its founders described as political correctness.

Aims
The campaign was founded by John and Laura Midgley in 2004.

The campaign had the political support of MP Philip Davies and his father, controversial and short-tenured Mayor of Doncaster, Peter Davies who ended up being disciplined by the council for breaching its code of conduct by failing to declare his membership of the group. As of October 2020, Laura Midgley holds a Parliamentary pass sponsored by Philip Davies in a secretarial or research capacity, which suggests she is in his employ.

Criticism
Paul Owen and Matthew Holehouse in The Guardian and Andrew Hough in The Daily Telegraph criticised the campaign when it was revealed that Philip Davies had sent 19 letters to Trevor Phillips, chairman of the Equality and Human Rights Commission in which he asked some "extraordinary" questions relating to race and sex discrimination. Reportedly, one letter asked: "Is it offensive to black up or not, particularly if you are impersonating a black person?" Davies enquires: "why it is so offensive to black up your face, as I have never understood this", this led some commentators to suggest that he was "lobbying for 'blacking up'" He also asked whether it was racist for a policeman to refer to a BMW as "black man's wheels" and whether the Metropolitan Black Police Association breaches discrimination law by restricting its membership to black people, an argument recently used by the British National Party in an unsuccessful attempt to maintain its white-only membership policy.

Current status
Since 2014, the website has only been available in archive versions and the last news story on its news page is dated to June 2011.

See also 
 The Official Politically Correct Dictionary and Handbook
 Politically Correct Bedtime Stories
 Politically Incorrect

References

External links 
The Campaign Against Political Correctness Official Website
Database of Archives of Non-Governmental Organisations - Campaign Against Political Correctness

2004 establishments in the United Kingdom
Political organisations based in England